Gilbertfield Castle is a ruined 17th-century castle in South Lanarkshire, Scotland.

History
The castle is within the former barony of Drumsagard, which was a possession of the Hamiltons. The castle was built in the early 17th century, and the date 1607 is displayed on a heraldic panel above the door. The castle was later lived in, around the turn of the 18th century, by William Hamilton of Gilbertfield (1665-1751), a retired soldier and writer. A friend of Allan Ramsay, he was responsible for translating Blind Harry's epic poem The Actes and Deidis of the Illustre and Vallyeant Campioun Schir William Wallace.

The castle
Gilbertfield is a well-planned L-plan tower house. The stair tower, which projects to the north, was large enough to accommodate a series of rooms as well as a square turnpike stair.

The basement level was vaulted, and contained cellars and a kitchen, which had a large fireplace and oven. A service stair connected the basement with the hall above. The hall itself had a smaller fireplace, as well as large windows with gunloops in between. Above the hall were two further floors, each with three rooms; two in the main block, and one in the wing. At the highest level, the garret, two round turrets projected at the south-east and north-west corners. There was no parapet.

The castle is now a neglected ruin, the east wall having collapsed in the 1950s. Only the corbelling of the north-west turret remains.which fell down in the late 1960s. It is now deemed extremely dangerous as a lot of the brick work has fallen each year. The turret fell in the 1970s. Gilbertfield Castle is a Scheduled Ancient Monument.

Nearby development
In March 2017, an application by Persimmon Homes to build over 400 houses in land immediately to the north of Gilbertfield Castle was approved by South Lanarkshire Council's planning committee; this was somewhat controversial as the land had previously been designated Green belt. Various concerns were raised by local residents, community councillors (representing Halfway/Cambuslang East district), the Lowland Reserve Forces and Cadets Association who have a rifle range adjacent to the site, and Clare Haughey and James Kelly, MSPs for the area, which were presented to the committee along with a 1300-signature petition opposing the development, without success. Revisions had already been made to the plans after the Scottish Environmental Protection Agency objected to the builder's initial submission in 2016.

A proposal for a further development directly incorporating the castle was publicised in May 2020.

References

Mason, Gordon The Castles of Glasgow and the Clyde, Goblinshead, 2000
Salter, Mike The Castles of South West Scotland, Folly Publications, 1993
National Monuments Record of Scotland Site Reference NS65NE 12

External links

Information and photos

Castles in South Lanarkshire
Scheduled Ancient Monuments in South Lanarkshire
Buildings and structures in Cambuslang
Tower houses in Scotland
Category B listed buildings in South Lanarkshire